Don Kulick (born 5 September 1960) is professor of anthropology at Uppsala University in Sweden. Kulick works within the frameworks of both cultural and linguistic anthropology, and has carried out field work in Papua New Guinea, Brazil, Italy and Sweden. Kulick is also known for his extensive fieldwork on the Tayap people and their language in Gapun village of East Sepik Province, Papua New Guinea.

Education 
Kulick received his B.A. in Anthropology and Linguistics from Lund University in Sweden in 1983 and his Ph.D. in Anthropology from Stockholm University in 1990.

Career 
Kulick's previous academic positions were at both Stockholm and Linköping Universities. He was previously a Professor of Anthropology and Director of the Center for the Study of Gender and Sexuality at New York University, before becoming a Professor of Anthropology and Chair of the Department of Comparative Human Development at the University of Chicago. As of 2015, Kulick is a Professor of Anthropology and leads the research program "New Perspectives on Vulnerability" at Uppsala University.

In the late 1990s, Kulick researched Travesti communities in Brazil and published his findings in multiple works, including The Gender of Brazilian Transgendered Prostitutes. Kulick notably included photographs in his study, as a visual aid to show common body modifications of Travesti. As well, many of the methods and theories that came from this study have been influential in other studies and discussions of sexual and gender identities within Latin American LGBTQ communities.

Kulick is known for his linguistic work, such as his study of the Tayap people of Papua New Guinea. This research included documenting the generational language shift from Tayap to Tok Pisin, as well as how gender and emotion interact with language in the context of the villagers of Gapun.

He has been considered one of Sweden's foremost queer theorists and was influential in introducing queer theory to Sweden.

Selected publications

Books

Chapters in books

Journal articles 
  Pdf.
  Pdf.
  Pdf.
  Pdf. 
  Pdf.

Further reading

References 

1960 births
Academic staff of Linköping University
Living people
Queer theorists
Swedish anthropologists
University of Chicago faculty
Linguists of Papuan languages
Linguists of Tayap
Stockholm University alumni